The Allerbach is a tributary of the Warme Bode in the Harz Mountains of central Germany.

The stream flows downhill in an easterly direction.

Regarding its confluence immediately next to the L 98 Landesstraße (Tanne – Königshütte section), the Allerbach forms the historic boundary of the Amt of Elbingerode. Even today there are numerous boundary stones left and right of the stream banks.

See also
List of rivers of Saxony-Anhalt

Rivers of Saxony-Anhalt
Rivers of Germany